is a video game character from the Tekken series by Namco Bandai Games. The character is a Brazilian capoeira fighter. Introduced in Tekken 3 in 1997, Eddy has since appeared in every game thereafter (albeit he is not a participant in the King of Iron Fist Tournament 4 story-wise), although he shares the same character slot as Christie Monteiro in Tekken 4 and Tekken 5, but regained his own slot in subsequent games beginning with Tekken 5: Dark Resurrection.

Eddy's storyline from his debut through Tekken 5 revolved around his quest for revenge for the murder of his parents, culminating in the defeat of Kazuya Mishima during the events of Tekken 5. From Tekken 5 onward, Eddy's plot focused on his and Christie Monteiro's search for a cure to an unknown illness that Christie's grandfather, Eddy's Capoeira master, was suffering from. Eddy was the first capoeira practitioner to appear in the Tekken franchise, followed by Tiger Jackson, a palette swap of Eddy in Tekken 3 and Tekken Tag Tournament; and Christie Monteiro, Eddy's replacement in Tekken 4. Eddy has received heavy criticism in the fighting video game community for the low skill floor associated with Eddy's play style;  however, the character, along with Christie, has been credited with popularizing the art of capoeira to a new audience within the larger gaming and martial arts community, and has influenced popular culture.

Character development
The Tekken 3 development team wanted to include a Capoeira practitioner for Tekken 3 and turned to the development artists to create the character. It was desired by Masahiro Kimoto, one of the game designers of Tekken 3, that the Capoeira character be female but the artist that was tasked with the character's design deemed the female character too difficult to create and instead created Eddy. Kimoto later stated that his favorite character from Tekken 3 was Eddy, because of the challenges in his development.

Mestre Marcelo Pereira, a Brazilian capoeira master, was the motion capture artist for Eddy Gordo in Tekken 3. Pereira stated that Namco had heard of him as a result of his 1995 International Capoeira Seminar held in San Francisco, and that he felt honored in being chosen by Namco to represent Capoeira in Tekken 3. Marcelo Pereira reported that during the development of Tekken 3 he had been injured, as a result the acrobatic movements he performed were restricted. He also claimed that he performed "about 20%" of what he was capable of performing because it was necessary to have "another skillful capoeirista to spar with" to perform some movements in Capoeira. Additionally, Pereira criticized Namco's naming choices for Eddy Gordo and his moves, noting that Eddy is not a Brazilian name and that "Gordo" in Portuguese meant "fat" and the movements' names were not "traditional" like the names he had called them during development.

In video games
Eddy Gordo first appeared in Tekken 3 and appeared in the following title, Tekken Tag Tournament. In Tekken 4, Eddy Gordo was omitted from the roster and was replaced with Christie Monteiro, another Capoeira practitioner, but appeared as an alternate costume for Christie and without serving any purpose in the storyline. Masahiro Kimoto stated that Eddy was replaced because initially, they had intended to create a female Capoeira character in Tekken 3 but instead changed to a male character due to artistic limitations. In Tekken 4, the team was able to successfully create "an attractive female character" who practiced Capoeira, so they chose to replace Eddy with her. Eddy Gordo later served as a character costume swap for Christie in Tekken 5, and became a separate character once again in the Tekken 5 update, Tekken 5: Dark Resurrection; however, while he did have his own character customizations, his moveset remained identical to Christie's. Eddy Gordo appeared again in Tekken 6, and its update, Tekken 6: Bloodline Rebellion, but his moveset has remained similar to Christie's, only differing in move properties such as speed and distance. Additionally, in Bloodline Rebellion, Eddy serves as the boss for the 28th level of the Scenario Campaign Mode, the "Tekken Force 4th Special Forces Operational Group Compound".

Eddy was born into one of the richest families in Brazil. When Eddy was 19 years old, his father was killed while trying to destroy a Brazilian drug cartel known as the "Organization". In his last breaths, Eddy's father asked his son to take responsibility for his death. Eddy went along with his father's last wish and served eight years in prison, during which he met an old man who taught him Capoeira. For his eight years of prison, Eddy practiced until he became a master. Upon his release, Eddy heard about the King of Iron Fist Tournament 3 and the Mishima Financial Empire (MFE), the sponsor of the tournament and a conglomerate compared to a "large slice of the world" which is owned by Heihachi Mishima. He decided to enter the tournament, believing he could either convince the MFE or take control of it and force it to help him get revenge on his father's killers. As shown in his Tekken 3 ending, Eddy tracked down the gang who killed his father; the gang members confessed that the killing had been ordered by Kazuya Mishima.

In Tekken 4, it is learned that while Eddy was in prison he learned of his master's granddaughter, Christie Monteiro, and made a promise to his master to teach her Capoeira when Eddy got out of prison. After the King of Iron Fist Tournament 3, Eddy found and taught Christie Capoeira, who became impressive at the martial art after two years of training. Soon after Christie's training, Eddy left, saying, "Those responsible for my father's death will pay." Christie Monteiro entered The King of Iron Fist Tournament 4 to find Eddy, as this was the only clue that could lead her to him.

Prior to Tekken 5, Eddy learns that the master who taught him capoeira in prison is about to be freed. Eddy goes to his release but discovers that his master has become a weak and frail old man, not the great Capoeira master he had studied under. After he takes his master to a hospital, Eddy learns that he is dying from an incurable disease that will give him less than six months to live. There is hope, however, if the Mishima Zaibatsu's technology and resources could be put to use. Knowing this and hearing the announcement of the fifth King of Iron Fist tournament, Eddy and Christie enter with the hopes of saving Christie's grandfather.

At the conclusion of The King of Iron Fist Tournament 5, Eddy spoke alone with Jin Kazama. Jin offered to lend him his money and resources to save his master's life in exchange for his allegiance with the Mishima Zaibatsu. Knowing that this could be the opportunity he had been looking for to save his master's life, Eddy complies. As the King of Iron Fist Tournament 6 approaches, Eddy himself has become involved in a number of criminal activities in the name of the Mishima Zaibatsu. In his ending and Tekken 7 however, even Mishima Zaibatsu's technology is also far from saving his master and eventually his death. Eddy attends the master's funeral with a grieving Christie, then angrily throws his Mishima Zaibatsu badge to the ground, signifying his end of service to the company and his failure. However, he still has his personal task to get revenge on Kazuya for ruining his life and involved his master and Christie along with it.

Eddy appears in the non-canon sequel of Tekken Tag Tournament, Tekken Tag Tournament 2 where he speaks his native language Portuguese, alongside Christie.

Eddy makes a series of brief cameos in Street Fighter X Tekken and its associated "Episode" trailers, as Christie, accompanied by Lei Wulong, seeks out Pandora in the hopes it will lead her to Eddy.

Gameplay
BradyGames, in 2009, attributed the "button masher" stigma to Eddy's "constantly shifting stances and unpredictable nature" in regards to casual gameplay of Tekken 6, while in competition the random actions of button mashing" lead to heavy punishment more often than not."

In other media and merchandise
In the 1997 original video animation Tekken: The Motion Picture, Eddy is seen during the opening introduction. In the 2011 CGI film Tekken: Blood Vengeance, Eddy's dossier is briefly seen when Anna Williams opens a file containing dossiers on various persons of interest.

In the 2009 live-action film Tekken, Eddy is portrayed by Brazilian capoeira fighter/stuntman Lateef Crowder. He participates in the Iron Fist tournament and is pitted against Raven, who defeats Eddy. Critics praised the accurate portrayal of Eddy toward the games, but criticized the brevity of Eddy's role in the film. Unlike the games, he has no relation to Christie Monteiro.

In 2003, Epoch Co. released an Eddy Gordo action figure as part of their Tekken Tag Tournament toyline; the toy featured interchangeable hands and a display stand.

Reception
Complex ranked Eddy as the seventeenth-"Most Dominant Fighting Game Character", commenting "You either think this dancing brawler is the greatest thing to happen to Tekken or you think he's the cheesiest character in the entire series." In early 1998, Electronic Gaming Monthly reported that Eddy Gordo was "the current fan favorite" of the Tekken 3 cast. In the official poll by Namco Bandai Games, Eddy was ranked as the ninth most requested Tekken character to be playable in Tekken X Street Fighter, at 10% of votes. In 2014, What Culture ranked him as the 14th greatest character in fighting games, calling him "the easiest, most intuitive character to get to grips with in any fighting game."

The character has been criticized for his perceived simplistic playability. MTV.com nicknamed him "Eddy 'Button-Masher's Savior' Gordo." Luke McKinney of GameSpy lambasted Eddy as "the worst thing to happen to fighting gamers since repetitive strain injury" and likened him to "Jar-Jar Binks, a floppy-limbed aberration staining a beloved classic." Dave Cook of NowGamer rated Eddy among his "10 most hated game characters ever" at tenth in 2010: "Eddy shouldn't even have a command list, just pictures of both kick buttons, because if you hammer both endlessly, you will win every round." Pete Dreyer of RedBull.com included Eddy in his selection of the "10 Cheapest Fighting Game Characters of All Time" for similar reasons in 2016: "Just start mashing those kick buttons until his legs start capoeira-ing all over the place and rake in the glory." In his 2014 article "In Defense of Button Mashing",  Kevin Wong of Kotaku explained his success at Tekken 3 with Eddy after having struggled playing as other characters: "I won't gild the lily by claiming any sort of thought out strategy. It was definitely button mashing, but I had never had so much fun."

Cultural impact
According to Eoin Lyons at Balls.ie, capoeira was "single handedly" introduced in Ireland by Eddy. Professional wrestler Kofi Kingston stated, "...guys like Eddy Gordo are very unique characters. When he was introduced into the Tekken series he was the guy everybody was talking about. People knew about Capoeira but they didn't really know what it was all about as far as moves and stuff." He also stated, "I watch a character like Eddy Gordo in 'Tekken' and his capoeira style, and its characters like that that I like to take from because of how they stand out." Fellow professional wrestler MVP attributed one of his moves called "Malicious Intent" to Eddy Gordo, calling it "a variation of one of [Eddy's] spinning kicks." MVP also considers Eddy Gordo as one of his favorite video game characters. Dane Cook referred to Eddy Gordo in the track "Struck by a Vehicle" from his second album Retaliation, joking that when someone gets struck by a car it "sends you flipping through the air like Eddy Gordo from Tekken when someone doesn't know how to do combos and they're just hitting the buttons randomly."

See also 
List of Tekken characters

References

Action film characters
Black characters in video games
Fictional businesspeople in video games
Dancer characters in video games
Fictional Brazilian people in video games
Fictional martial artists in video games
Fictional capoeira practitioners
Fictional henchmen in video games
Male characters in video games
Fictional mercenaries in video games
Orphan characters in video games
Fictional soldiers in video games
Tekken characters
Video game characters introduced in 1997
Fictional Afro-Brazilian people